Jarrid "Jay" Collins is an American politician serving as a member of the Florida Senate for the 14th district. He assumed office on November 8, 2022.

Early life and education 
Collins was born in Scobey, Montana. He earned a Bachelor of Science degree in health sciences and pre-medicine from American Military University and a Master of Science in organizational leadership from Norwich University.

Career 
Collins served in the United States Army from 1995 to 2018, including as member of the United States Army Special Forces. During his career, he was assigned to the United States Army Special Operations Command, Special Warfare Medical Group, 7th Special Forces Group, and 1st Special Forces Group.

As a Green Beret, Collins deployed to Afghanistan, Iraq, and twice to South America. During his 2007 Afghanistan deployment, Collins was hit in the arm, continued fighting, and later helped perform surgery on himself in the field of battle. Staying in country, he returned to full combat operations after just 30 days of recovery. A few months later, he sustained injuries that would eventually lead to the amputation of his leg years later. Collins would overcome his chronic injuries to be selected for US Army Special Operations Command, but ultimately had to have his leg amputated due to the severity of his condition. Following his amputation, Collins requalified as a fully deployable Green Beret and served over five more years on active duty.  He retired from the U.S. Army in the rank of First Sergeant (E-8).

His military awards and decorations include the Combat Infantryman Badge, Master Parachutist Badge, Military Freefall Parachutist Badge, Legion of Merit, Soldier's Medal, Purple Heart, Bronze Star Medal, Meritorious Service Medal, and numerous other personal, unit, and service awards.  He is also a recipient of the U.S. Army Special Operations Command's Major General John K. Singlaub / Jedburgh Award.

He was elected to the Florida Senate in November 2022 after defeating longtime incumbent state senator Janet Cruz.

References 

Living people
People from Scobey, Montana
People from Tampa, Florida
Norwich University alumni
People from Daniels County, Montana
Florida Republicans
21st-century American politicians
Year of birth missing (living people)